Thomas Morgan (8 June 1727 – 15 May 1771) was a Welsh politician, of the Morgans of Tredegar. He was the eldest son of Thomas Morgan, Judge Advocate General of the Army,  and his wife Jane Colchester.

Morgan represented Brecon in the House of Commons from 1754 until 1763. That year, he accepted the Stewardship of the Manor of Old Shoreham to succeed his late cousin, Sir William Morgan in Monmouthshire, which he represented from 1763 until his death in 1771.

He was briefly Lord Lieutenant of Brecknockshire and Monmouthshire in succession to his father, who died in 1769. Morgan died unmarried, and left his estates (Rhiwperra Castle and Tredegar House) to his younger brother, Charles Morgan.

References

|-

1727 births
1771 deaths
Members of the Parliament of Great Britain for Welsh constituencies
British MPs 1754–1761
British MPs 1761–1768
British MPs 1768–1774
Lord-Lieutenants of Brecknockshire
Lord-Lieutenants of Monmouthshire